Anson was a community, now extinct, in Richland Township, Miami County, in the U.S. state of Indiana.

History
Anson was laid out in 1853. When the Indianapolis, Peru and Chicago Railroad was built in Miami County, it was not extended to Anson, and the village became a ghost town.

References

External links
 

Geography of Miami County, Indiana
Ghost towns in Indiana